Vilariño may refer to:

Ander Vilariño (born 1979), Spanish racing driver
Vilariño de Conso, municipality in Galicia, Spain